Valkenburg means falcon castle in Dutch and can refer to:

 Valkenburg aan de Geul, a town and municipality in the province of Limburg
 Valkenburg Castle, ruined castle near Valkenburg aan de Geul
 Valkenburg, South Holland, a village in the municipality of Katwijk in the province of South Holland
 Valkenburg Naval Air Base, a former Royal Netherlands Navy air base
 Valkenburg (surname), a Dutch surname